The 2012 Italian Formula Three Championship was the 48th and the final season Italian Formula Three Championship season. It was the first split in European and Italian series. The European Championship began on 31 March in Valencia, while the Italian Championship commenced on 9 June at Mugello. They finished together on 21 October at Monza.

Teams and drivers
 All cars were powered by FPT engines, and run on Kumho tyres; all teams are Italian-registered.

Calendar
 An eight-round calendar was announced on 7 December 2011. The series will adopt a format used in a majority of the Formula Three series, with three races a weekend, two of which held on the Saturday and the final race on the Sunday. The Valencia and Hungaroring rounds were support races to the World Touring Car Championship.

Championship standings
Points were awarded as follows:

European Series

Drivers' standings

Rookies' standings

Teams' standings

Italian Series

Drivers' standings

Teams' standings

References

External links
 Official Website

Italian Formula Three Championship seasons
Formula Three
Italian Formula Three Championship
Italian Formula 3 Championship